Alfred Edments (17 October 1853 – 13 July 1909) was a merchant and philanthropist in Australia.

Early life and education
Edments was born in London, the son of James Edments, a labourer, and his wife Ann, née Lyons. He had only a primary education and at an early age began to work for a firm of cork merchants.

Career
He left for Australia at the age of 19 and arrived at Sydney. He obtained a position, saved a little money, began working as a peddler in a small way, and then opened a shop in Sydney where he sold goods by auction. Edments went to Melbourne in 1888 and started an auction room in Bourke Street, Melbourne. He also for a short period was a bookmaker, attending only the principal meetings, but found this did not suit his health and soon gave it up. He also gave up having auctions and opened a shop selling watches, clocks and fancy goods, which steadily prospered. He visited England in 1892 to arrange for direct buying, and after trying various locations, finally settled his place of business at 309-311 Bourke Street, Melbourne, in 1895.

The business grew and Edments began to open branches in the suburbs and in Hobart, Tasmania.  He kept a close watch on every detail, thoroughly trained his staff, and treated them with great consideration.

Employee management
Every employee had a fortnight's holiday on full pay, and when ill, Edments continued to pay their salaries and often their medical fees.

Legacy
He himself worked very hard and his health began to cause anxiety when he was only in his early forties. He paid frequent visits to England and in 1898 opened a London office. For the last six months of his life he was compelled to manage his business from his home. Edments died at Melbourne on 13 July 1909 of heart disease. He married but had no children. At his death left a large proportion of his considerable fortune to charity via the Alfred Edments Trust. This in 1940 amounted to about £150,000 and about £6000 is distributed every year. The rest of his fortune was left to his niece E Dench who had no children and left her fortune at her death to Ewen Middlemiss estimated at the time to be $20 million.

References

1853 births
1909 deaths
19th-century Australian philanthropists
19th-century Australian businesspeople